Im Ho (born January 27, 1970) is a South Korean actor, best known for his roles mostly as an emperor in historical dramas. His notable roles were included in the television series Jang Hui-bin (1995) and Dae Jang Geum (2003).

Personal life
Im graduated from Chung-Ang University with a bachelor's degree in theater and film. Im's father is the late screenwriter Im Chung, who wrote Jang Hui-bin, among other television and film scripts.

Filmography

Films
Ghost Taxi as Byeong-su (2000)
My Sassy Girl as the Blind Date guy
Don't Tell Papa as Borisu (2004)
Clementine as O Ji-hun (2004)
February 29 as Bak Hyeong-sa (2006)
Secret Love as hairstylist (2010)
Earth Rep Rolling Series as Elvis (2010)

Source: Korean Movie Database

Television
 Vengeance of the Bride as Yoon Jae-ha (2022, Cameo) 
President Jeong Yak-yong as Han Min-guk (2022, Film television) 
Haechi as Yi Kwang-jwa (2019)
Blessing of the Sea  as Jo Ji-hwan (2019, Cameo)
Dal Soon's Spring  as Han Tae-sung (2017)
Teacher Oh Soon-nam  as Jang Ji-ho (2017, Cameo)
Night Light  as Kang Jae-hyun (2016)
The Flower in Prison as Kang Seon-ho (2016)
Page Turner as Yoon Yoo-seul's doctor (2016)
The Merchant: Gaekju 2015 as Min Kyom-ho (2015)
The Stars Are Shining as Seo Dong-pil (2015)
Splendid Politics as Choi Myung-kil (2015)
What Happens to My Family?  as Judge (2014, Cameo)
Jeong Do-jeon  as Jeong Mong-ju (2014)
Your Lady as Ra Jin-goo (2013)
I Love Lee Taly as Geum San (2012)
Gwanggaeto, The Great Conqueror as Murong Bao (2011)
You Don't Know Women as Kang Sung-chan (2010)
Queen Seondeok as Jinji of Silla (2009)
He Who Can't Marry as Park Kwang-nam (2009)
Wanted: Son-In-Law as Kim Tae-pyeong (2008)
My Home (2008)
Strongest Chil Woo as Crown Prince Sohyeon (2008)
New Birth of Married Couple as Bong Su (2008)
Kid Gang as Jo Pyo-gi (2007)
Barefoot of Love as Hwang Jin-suk (2006)
Dae Jo Yeong as Yeon Namsaeng (2006)
Woman Above Flower as Yoon Myung-won (2005)
Wind Flower as Choi Hyung-joo (2005)
Not Alone (2004)
The Woman Who Wants to Marry as Park Sun-woo (2004)
Lovers (2003)
Dae Jang Geum as King Jungjong (2003)
Girl's School as Lee Gyu-won (2002)
Man of the Sun, Lee Je Ma as Choi Moon-hwan (2002)
Whenever the Heart Beats as Lee Jun-ho (2002)
Her House as Nam Hyuk (2001)
Honey Honey (2001)
Everyday with You as Choi Dong-ha (2001)
Rural Diary (2000)
Due to You, Darling (2000)
Because of You as Han Young-jun (2000)
Hur Joon as Lee Jung-myung (1999)
The Great King’s Road as Crown Prince Sado (1998)
Fresh Son-Ja’s tactics (1998)
Sea of Ambition as Jung Min-woo (1997)
ManGang (Full-Heartedness) (1996)
Jang Hee Bin as Sukjong of Joseon (1995)
Due to Your Being (1994)

Television show

Theater

References 

1970 births
Living people
South Korean male television actors
South Korean male film actors
Chung-Ang University alumni